Sfalassà Viaduct is a  viaduct near Bagnara Calabra, Calabria, Italy. The bridge is located on Autostrada A2 Salerno-Reggio Calabria Motorway and has a main span of 376 metres. It is the highest and longest span frame bridge in the world and  it is among the 50 highest bridges of any type. It is the second highest bridge in Italy after the Italia Viaduct. The Sfalassà Viaduct won the CECM European award three times.

See also
List of highest bridges in the world

References

External links
http://en.structurae.de/structures/data/index.cfm?ID=s0002297
http://www.highestbridges.com/wiki/index.php?title=Sfalassa_Bridge
 :it:Autostrada A3 (Italia)#I viadotti lucano - calabri

Bridges in Italy
Bridges completed in 1974